Local elections were held in Batangas City on May 9, 2016 within the Philippine general election.  The voters will elect candidates for the elective local posts in the city: the mayor, vice mayor, the congressman (which will represent Batangas' fifth district which is composed of just the city), two provincial board members, and the 12 members of its city council.

Unlike in the 2013 elections, voters of the city will be electing its first member in the House of Representatives, two representatives to the Batangas provincial board, and two more councilors thus bringing the councilors' total to 12 as opposed to the previous 10.

Background

Mayoral and Vice Mayoral elections
Incumbent Mayor Eduardo Dimacuha is running for his eighth nonconsecutive term as Mayor of Batangas. He assumed the mayorship in 1988 and until 1998. He again ran for Mayor in 2001 and was elected in 2004 and 2007. He then elected again in 2013. He will run for his tenth nonconsecutive term as Mayor without a vice mayoral candidate under the Liberal Party.

His opponent is councilor Kristine Balmes, incidentally his former daughter-in-law under the PDP–Laban.

On December 9, 2015, Dimacuha withdrew his candidacy for Mayor. Substituting him is his youngest and only daughter, Beverley Rose Dimacuha, also wife of incumbent Board Member Mario Vittorio "Marvey" Mariño. This will be the first time, that women will be battling the mayoralty post. Whoever wins will be the second female mayor next to former Mayor Vilma Dimacuha who was elected in 2010.

Candidates

District Representative
Incumbent Board Member Mario Vittorio Mariño will run for the newly created 5th District against Danilo Berberabe.

Provincial Board Members

|-

|-
|colspan=5 bgcolor=black|

|-

|-

|-

Mayor
Incumbent Mayor Eduardo Dimacuha is running for reelection. Running without his vice mayoralty partner, his opponent is incumbent councilor Kristine Balmes, incidentally his former daughter-in-law. On December 10, Mayor Dimachua withdrew his bid for reelection bid to give way to his daughter Beverley Rose Dimacuha-Mariño, wife of congressional candidate and incumbent board member Marvey Mariño.

Vice Mayor
Incumbent Vice Mayor Emilio "Jun" Berberabe is running unopposed.  He is Balmes' running mate.

Councilors

Team Dimacuha

Team Balmes

|colspan=5 bgcolor=black|

References

2016 Philippine local elections
Elections in Batangas City
2016 elections in Calabarzon